Anderson Souza Conceição (born 1 February 1994), known as Anderson Talisca or Talisca, is a Brazilian professional footballer who plays as an attacking midfielder and forward for Saudi Professional League club Al Nassr.

Club career

Bahia
A youth graduate from Bahia, where he arrived in 2009, Talisca made his professional debut against Corinthians on 7 July 2013, and scored his first goal in the next match against São Paulo.

Benfica
On 5 July 2014, after his debut season, Talisca moved to Portuguese champions Benfica for a €4.75 million fee (agent fee included), the highest paid for a Bahia player. On 18 July 2014, he scored his first goal for Benfica on his debut in their Taça de Honra semi-final win against Estoril. On 12 September, he scored a hat-trick in an away victory against Vitória de Setúbal. On 27 September, he scored two goals in a row against Estoril in an away win (3–2) and became the Primeira Liga's top goalscorer with five goals. On 5 October, he scored his sixth goal in Portuguese league and maintained the top scorer lead. On 31 October, he scored his eighth and fourth consecutive goal in Primeira Liga, in a home win against Rio Ave (1–0), keeping the top scorer lead.

On 4 November 2014, he scored his first goal in the UEFA Champions League, the only goal of the game to defeat Monaco in the group stage. He described scoring the 82nd-minute goal as the "best feeling" in his life. On 26 January 2016, he netted a hat-trick in a 6–1 win at Moreirense in the Taça da Liga.

In the 2015–16 season, Talisca scored Benfica's winning goal in a 2–1 away victory against Zenit Saint Petersburg in the second leg of UEFA Champions League's round of 16, to make the aggregate score 3–1. On 8 May, he sealed the 2–0 away win at Marítimo in the league with a direct free kick.

Beşiktaş (loan)
On 24 August 2016, Talisca joined Turkish club Beşiktaş on a 1+1-year loan deal for a €2 million fee for the first season. Talisca signed a contract worth €1.5 million in the first season plus bonuses. On 13 September, on his return to the Estádio da Luz in a Champions League group game, he scored an added-time free kick to ensure a 1–1 draw.

Guangzhou Evergrande
On 8 June 2018, Talisca was loaned out to Chinese Super League side Guangzhou Evergrande for a half year, with the transfer costing €5.8 million. He made his debut for Guangzhou Evergrande as a starter and scored a hat-trick, including a direct free kick, to help his team win 4–0 over Guizhou Hengfeng in the league on 18 July. On 29 July 2018, he scored two goals in his second appearance for Guangzhou in a 5–0 home win over Chongqing Dangdai Lifan.

On 26 October 2018, Benfica announced that Talisca had moved permanently to the Chinese club for a transfer fee of €19.2 million.

Al Nassr
On 17 May 2021, Talisca joined Saudi Professional League side Al Nassr for a reported transfer fee of $9.5 million. On 16 December 2022, he scored a hat-trick for the club, helping his side to a 4–1 away league victory against Al-Raed.

International career
On 11 November 2014, Talisca was called up by Dunga to the Brazil national team to replace Lucas Moura in the international fixtures against Turkey and Austria.

He was called again by coach Tite in March 2018 to take part in the away friendly fixtures against Russia and Germany. He has yet to make his debut for the senior team, however.

Style of play
He has been nicknamed "Yaya Talisca" in reference to Ivorian midfielder Yaya Touré, but bases his game on that of his compatriot Neymar. He has also been compared to fellow Brazilian Rivaldo. After joining Saudi club Al-Nassr, he was given the nickname “The Musician” (الموسيقار).

Career statistics

Honours

Bahia
Campeonato Baiano: 2014

Benfica
Primeira Liga: 2014–15, 2015–16
Taça da Liga: 2014–15, 2015–16
Supertaça Cândido de Oliveira: 2014

Beşiktaş
Süper Lig: 2016–17

Guangzhou Evergrande
Chinese Super League: 2019

Brazil U20
Toulon Tournament: 2013

Individual
SJPF Player of the Month: August/September 2014
Taça da Liga Top Scorer: 2015–16 (shared)
UEFA Champions League Breakthrough XI: 2017

References

External links

 
 

1994 births
Living people
People from Feira de Santana
Association football forwards
Brazilian footballers
Esporte Clube Bahia players
S.L. Benfica footballers
Beşiktaş J.K. footballers
Guangzhou F.C. players
Al Nassr FC players
Campeonato Brasileiro Série A players
Primeira Liga players
Süper Lig players
Chinese Super League players
Saudi Professional League players
Expatriate footballers in Portugal
Expatriate footballers in Turkey
Expatriate footballers in China
Expatriate footballers in Saudi Arabia
Brazilian expatriate footballers
Brazilian expatriate sportspeople in Portugal
Brazilian expatriate sportspeople in Turkey
Brazilian expatriate sportspeople in China
Brazilian expatriate sportspeople in Saudi Arabia
Brazil youth international footballers
Sportspeople from Bahia